Geaney is an Irish surname, the Anglicized form of the Gaelic Mag Éanna, which is derived from the personal name Éanna.

Kerry Gaelic footballers
 David Geaney (Castleisland Gaelic footballer)
 David Geaney (Kerry Gaelic footballer, born 1985)
 Mary Geaney
 Michael Geaney
 Paul Geaney
 Seán Geaney

References

Anglicised Irish-language surnames